Outbound marketing may refer to:
 Older, non-pejorative sense of marketing communications
 Newer, pejorative sense of interruption marketing

See also